Adam Kaufman may refer to:

Adam Kaufman (24 character), fictional character in the American television series 24
Adam Kaufman (actor), American actor